(Bastien and Bastienne), K. 50 (revised in 1964 to K. 46b) is a one-act singspiel, a comic opera, by Wolfgang Amadeus Mozart.

 was one of Mozart's earliest operas, written in 1768 when he was only twelve years old. It was allegedly commissioned by Viennese physician and 'magnetist' Dr. Franz Mesmer (who himself would later be parodied in Così fan tutte) as a satire of the 'pastoral' genre then prevalent, and specifically as a parody of the opera Le devin du village by Jean-Jacques Rousseau. After its supposed premiere in Mesmer's garden theater (that is only corroborated by an unverified account of Nissen), it was not revived again until 1890. It is not clear whether this piece was performed in Mozart's lifetime. The first known performance was on 2 October 1890 at Architektenhaus in Berlin.

The opera is written in both French and German manners. Many of the melodies are French in manner, but Bastienne's first aria is true German lied. This melody is also used in Mozart's Trio in G for Piano, Violin and Violoncello, K. 564 (1788). Another purely German lied is Bastienne's aria "I feel certain of his heart". Mozart utilizes the orchestra sparingly, with the exception of the reconciliation scene.

The opening theme of Mozart's overture resembles that of the first movement of Beethoven's Symphony no. 3, Eroica (in a different key). It is unlikely that Beethoven was familiar with Mozart's youthful opera. In any case, opening a movement with an arpeggio of the tonic chord was an extremely common occurrence in the Classical period. The resemblance is likely coincidental.

Although he was very young, Mozart already had excellent vocal writing skills and a knack for parody and whimsy which would reach full flower in his later works.  is possibly the easiest to perform of Mozart's juvenile works.

Roles

Synopsis 
Place: A pastoral village
Time: Indeterminate
Bastienne, a shepherdess, fears that her "dearest friend", Bastien, has forsaken her for another pretty face, and decides to go into the pasture to be comforted by her flock of lambs.

Before she can leave, however, she runs into Colas, the village soothsayer. Bastienne requests the help of his magical powers to help win back her Bastien. Colas (being a soothsayer) knows all about the problem, and comforts her with the knowledge that Bastien has not abandoned her, rather, he's merely been distracted lately by 'the lady of the manor'. His advice is to act coldly towards Bastien, which will make him come running back.

Bastien is heard approaching, so Bastienne hides herself. Bastien swaggers in, proclaiming how much he loves Bastienne. Colas informs him that Bastienne has a new lover. Bastien is shocked and asks the magician for help.

Colas opens his book of spells and recites a nonsense aria filled with random syllables and Latin quotations. Colas declares the spell a success and that Bastienne is in love with Bastien once more. Bastienne, however, decides to keep up the game a bit longer and spurns Bastien with great vehemence. Bastien threatens suicide, which Bastienne merely shrugs off.

Finally, the two decide that they have gone far enough and agree to reconcile. Colas joins them as they all sing a final trio in praise of the magician.

Noted arias 

 "Mein liebster Freund hat mich verlassen" – Bastienne
 "Ich geh' jetzt auf die Weide" – Bastienne
 "Befraget mich ein zartes Kind" – Colas
 "Wenn mein Bastien einst im Scherze" – Bastienne
 "Würd' ich auch, wie manche Buhlerinnen" – Bastienne
 "Grossen Dank dir abzustatten" – Bastien
 "Geh'! du sagst mir eine Fabel" – Bastien
 "Diggi, daggi, shurry, murry" – Colas
 "Meiner Liebsten schöne Wangen" – Bastien
 "Er war mir sonst treu und ergeben" – Bastienne

Recordings

See also 
 List of operas by Mozart

References 
Notes

External links 

 
 Bastien und Bastienne, libretto 
 

Operas by Wolfgang Amadeus Mozart
German-language operas
Singspiele
1768 operas
One-act operas
Operas